The Little Caesars Championship Tennis Tournament is a defunct men's tennis tournament that was played on the Grand Prix tennis circuit for one year in 1988. The event was held in Detroit, Michigan and was played on indoor carpet courts.  John McEnroe won the singles event while Rick Leach and Jim Pugh teamed-up to win the doubles event.

Finals

Singles

Doubles

References
 Singles Draw
 Doubles Draw

Carpet court tennis tournaments
Defunct tennis tournaments in the United States
Grand Prix tennis circuit
Indoor tennis tournaments
Little Caesars
ATP Tour
Tennis in Detroit
Sports competitions in Detroit
Tennis tournaments in Michigan